General Sir Herbert Alexander Lawrence,  (8 August 1861 – 17 January 1943) was a general in the British Army, a banker and a businessman.

Early life
Lawrence was born in London on 8 August 1861, the son of Sir John Laird Mair Lawrence, later Lord Lawrence and the Governor-General of India, and his wife Harriette Katherine Hamilton. He was educated at Harrow School and the Royal Military College, Sandhurst.

Military career
Commissioned into the 17th Lancers as a lieutenant on 10 May 1882, he was stationed in India and promoted to captain on 25 February 1892 before he entered the Staff College, Camberley in 1894. After graduating in 1896 he was appointed a staff captain (intelligence) at the War Office. He was promoted to major on 22 November 1899, at the outbreak of the Second Boer War in South Africa. During the war, he served on the intelligence staff of Sir John French's cavalry division with Douglas Haig and received a brevet promotion to lieutenant colonel in the 16th Lancers on 29 November 1900. For his service in the war, he was twice mentioned in despatches and received the Queen's South Africa Medal with six clasps. He stayed in South Africa throughout the war, which ended June 1902 with the Peace of Vereeniging. Four months later, he was among 540 officers and men of the 17th Lancers who left Cape Town on the SS German in late September 1902, and arrived at Southampton in late October, when they were posted to Edinburgh.

He resigned his commission in 1903 and became a city banker. He was also a director of the Midland Railway.

When the First World War started he was recalled for army service and became general staff officer of the 2nd Yeomanry Division, serving in Egypt and at Gallipoli. In June 1915 he was given the command of the 127th (Manchester) Brigade, part of the 42nd (East Lancs) Territorial Division.

Lawrence became General Officer Commanding 52nd (Lowland) Infantry Division at Gallipoli in September 1915 and during the evacuation at the end of 1915 he oversaw the withdrawal at Cape Helles beach. In 1916 he returned to Egypt and achieved success at the Battle of Romani, but asked to be relieved of his command later in the year and was transferred to the 71st Home Service Division in England. In 1917 he was in France as commander of the 66th (2nd East Lancashire) Division, with whom he remained until made chief intelligence officer on Haig's staff in January 1918. He then took over from Sir Launcelot Kiggell as Chief of Staff in France and was promoted full general.

Lawrence was made Knight Commander of the Order of the Bath in 1917 and Knight Grand Cross of the Order of the Bath in 1926. He also received, as well as other overseas honours, the Croix de Guerre and was made a Grand Officer of the Legion of Honour in 1919. He was awarded the Army Distinguished Service Medal, the citation for which reads:

In 1919 he was given the Colonelcy of the 21st (Empress of India's) Lancers, transferring after amalgamation to the 17th/21st Lancers, a position he held until 1938. From 1925 to 1932 he was also Colonel of the Manchester Regiment.

Later life

After the war he was appointed as a member of the Royal Commission on the Coal Industry in 1925, a trustee of the Imperial War Graves Commission in 1926 and a governor of Wellington College. He became chairman of Vickers in 1926 and of Glyn's Bank in 1934. He was also chairman of several other banks and a director of a number of companies. He lived for some time in Dean's Place in Alfriston and later moved to Little Berkhamsted.

He died in 1943 and was buried at Seal, near Sevenoaks, Kent. He had married Isabel Mary Mills, the daughter of Charles William Mills, 2nd Baron Hillingdon in Sevenoaks in 1892. Their two sons, Oliver James Lawrence and Michael Charles Lawrence, were both killed in action during the First World War.

Bibliography

References

|-

1861 births
1943 deaths
British Army generals
Burials in Kent
People from London
People educated at Harrow School
Graduates of the Royal Military College, Sandhurst
British Army generals of World War I
British Army personnel of the Second Boer War
British bankers
Grand Crosses of the Order of the Crown (Belgium)
Grand Officiers of the Légion d'honneur
Grand Officers of the Order of Aviz
Knights Grand Cross of the Order of the Bath
Recipients of the Croix de Guerre 1914–1918 (France)
Recipients of the Croix de guerre (Belgium)
Recipients of the Distinguished Service Medal (US Army)
Younger sons of barons
People from Alfriston
People from Little Berkhamsted
Graduates of the Staff College, Camberley
Foreign recipients of the Distinguished Service Medal (United States)
Military personnel from London